The 1976 United States presidential election in Alaska took place on November 2, 1976, as part of the nationwide presidential election. Voters chose three representatives, or electors to the Electoral College, who voted for president and vice president.

Alaska was won by incumbent President Gerald Ford (R-Michigan) with 57.9% of the popular vote against  Jimmy Carter (D-Georgia) with 35.7%. Carter ultimately won the national vote however, defeating Ford and becoming the next President.  Alaska has only voted Democratic once, and that was in 1964 for Lyndon B. Johnson. 

With 57.9% of the popular vote, Alaska would prove to be Ford's fifth strongest state in the 1976 election after Utah, Idaho, Wyoming and Nebraska.

Libertarian candidate Roger MacBride also had his strongest showing in Alaska, which would continue to provide a base of votes for the new party.

Results

See also
United States presidential elections in Alaska

References

1976 Alaska elections
Alaska
1976